Aridaía (S'botsko) is a town and a former municipality in the Pella regional unit, Greece. Since the 2011 local government reform it is part of the municipality Almopia, of which it is a municipal unit. It was the capital of the former Almopia eparchy. It is located in the northwest corner of the Pella regional unit, bordering the southern part of the North Macedonia and the northeast corner of the Florina regional unit. The population of Aridaia proper is 7,057, while that of the entire municipal unit is 20,313 (2011 census). Its largest other towns are Prómachoi (pop. 1,740), Sosándra (1,078), Ápsalos (1,121), Loutráki (1,146), Polykárpi (1,049), Tsákoi (961), Voreinó (766), and Χifianí (767). The municipal unit is divided into 17 communities.

The town was used to be called "Αρδέα" (Ardea).

The Municipal Department of Aridea includes the settlement of Ydrea with a population of 600 inhabitants.

Aridea was freed on November 4, 1912, during the 1st Balkan War, and started to develop as a town after the installment of refugees from Asia Minor.

Etymology 
There are two possible etymologies of the name Aridea. One is that "Aridea", is a corruption of the old name of the town "Ardea", which comes from the verb ", which is explained by the multiple rivers, streams, irrigation canals, etc. Another explanation is that the name "Aridea" comes from Philip III Arrideus, half-brother of Alexander the Great.

Sights 
At a distance of 7 km from Aridea is the Byzantine Castle of Chrysi which dates back to the 8th century AD. North of Aridea is a historic, though not very well known Monastery of the Province of Almopia, the Holy Monastery of Saint Hilarion, bishop of Moglena. This monastery has as its owner and founder Saint Hilarion himself, who was a great Hierarch of the Church of Greece in the 12th century, who lived and worked in the area of today's Almopia.

It is a tourist destination with many infrastructures and all the amenities in combination with the Kaimaktsalan Ski Center which geographically belongs to the Municipality of Almopia. Next to the tourist village of Loutraki, seat of Loutra Pozar, is the tourist village of Orma from which the road to the Ski Center starts.

Sports 
A well-known football team based in Aridea is Almopos Arideas.

Transport

Bus service 
The KTEL station is located on Passia Street, on the road to Exaplatanos and Notia. The KTEL of Pella connects Aridea locally with Edessa, with regular itineraries, and there are also routes to Athens, Skydra and Thessaloniki.

Rail service 
The town does not have a railway station and is served by the railway stations of Edessa and Skydra, while in the period 1916-1936 there was a railway station, since there was a railway line from Skydra to Aridea and Orma that closed in 1936. Railway Station, houses the Museum of Natural History. On February 19, 2019, the construction of the railway line Agios Athanasios – Chalkidona – Koufalia – Pella – Nea Pella – Giannitsa – Galatades – Karyotissa – Dafni – Kalivia – Skydra-Edessa and bypass from Skydra to Aridaia was announced, however no study has been presented, and it is currently unknown when the project will be completed.

Roads 
There is no National Road passing through the town, but there are five (5) provincial roads that connect Aridea with the surrounding settlements. The following streets pass through the town

 Edessa - Apsalos - Aridea. (Pella 1)
 Aridea - Exaplatanos to Skra and Axioupoli, Evropos Notia and Lagadia. (Pella 6)
 Aridea - Pozar Baths. (Pella 7)
 Aridea - Tsakona - Polykarpi. (Pella 8)
 Aridea - Sosandra - Promachos. (Pella 9)

Air service 
In the Prefecture of Pella there is no airport, so Aridea is served by the Airport "Macedonia" of Thessaloniki.

People from Aridaia 
Petros Dourdoumpakis, singer
Haris Kostopoulos,singer
Antonis Minou, football player
Giorgos Paschalides, civil mechanic and minister
Nikodim Tsarknias, priest of the Macedonian Orthodox Church
Unboxholics, YouTubers, Twitch streamers
Loukas Vyntra, Greek footballer
Nikolaos Xenitides, businessman and benefactor
Despina Zapounidou, Greek Olympic race walker

References

External links 

Official site of the municipality of Almopia
Here, you can see pictures from the local community

Populated places in Pella (regional unit)